The Youth Development Commission (YDC) was established in 2018 by the Hong Kong Government to enhance policy coordination within the Government and enable a more holistic and effective examination and discussion of issues of concern to young people. The current-term Government has further established the Home and Youth Affairs Bureau (HYAB) to formulate an overall youth policy and a blueprint for youth development, and to set policy objectives for the healthy and diversified development of young people with a view to improving their upward mobility. The commission is one of the high-level government commissions in Hong Kong's political landscape, with many members having influential standing in their respective fields. Some members are also future generations of affluent families in Hong Kong.

References

Government of Hong Kong